The morpho butterflies comprise many species of Neotropical butterfly under the genus Morpho. This genus includes more than 29 accepted species and 147 accepted subspecies, found mostly in South America, Mexico, and Central America. The name morpho, meaning "changed" or "modified", is also an epithet.
Blue morphos are severely threatened by the deforestation of tropical forests and habitat fragmentation. Humans provide a direct threat to this spectacular creature because their beauty attracts artists and collectors from all over the globe who wish to capture and display them. Aside from humans, birds like the jacamar and flycatcher are the adult butterfly’s natural predators.

Taxonomy and nomenclature 
Many names attach to the genus Morpho. The genus has also been divided into subgenera. Hundreds of form, variety, and aberration names are used among Morpho species and subspecies. One lepidopterist includes all such species within a single genus, and synonymized many names in a limited number of species. Two other lepidopterists use a phylogenetic analysis with different nomenclature. Other authorities accept many more species.

Etymology 
The genus name Morpho comes from an Ancient Greek epithet , roughly "the shapely one", for Aphrodite, goddess of love and beauty.

Species 
This list is arranged alphabetically within species groups.

Subgenus Iphimedeia
Species group hercules
Morpho amphitryon Staudinger, 1887
Morpho hercules (Dalman, 1823) – Hercules morpho
Morpho richardus Fruhstorfer, 1898 – Richard's morpho
Species group hecuba
Morpho cisseis C. Felder & R. Felder, 1860 – Cisseis morpho
Morpho hecuba (Linnaeus, 1771) – sunset morpho
Species group telemachus
Morpho telemachus (Linnaeus, 1758)
Morpho theseus Deyrolle, 1860 – Theseus morpho

Subgenus Iphixibia
Morpho anaxibia (Esper, 1801)

Subgenus Cytheritis
Species group sulkowskyi
Morpho sulkowskyi – Sulkowsky's morpho
Species group lympharis
Morpho lympharis Butler, 1873 – Lympharis morpho
Species group rhodopteron
Morpho rhodopteron Godman & Salvin, 1880
Species group portis
Morpho portis (Hübner, [1821])
Morpho thamyris C. Felder & R. Felder, 1867 – Thamyris morpho – or as a subspecies of M. portis
Species group zephyritis
Morpho zephyritis Butler, 1873 – Zephyritis morpho
Species group aega
Morpho aega (Hübner, [1822]) – Aega morpho
Species group adonis
Morpho eugenia Deyrolle, 1860 – Empress Eugénie morpho
Morpho marcus (Cramer, 1775)
Morpho uraneis Bates, 1865

Subgenus Balachowskyna
Morpho aurora – Aurora morpho

Subgenus Cypritis
Species group cypris
Morpho cypris Westwood, 1851 – Cypris morpho
Species group rhetenor
Morpho helena Staudinger, 1890 – Helena blue morpho
Morpho rhetenor (Cramer, [1775]) – Rhetenor blue morpho

Subgenus Pessonia
Species group polyphemus
Morpho luna Butler, 1869 or as subspecies Morpho polyphemus luna
Morpho polyphemus Westwood, [1850] – (Polyphemus) white morpho
Species group catenaria 
Morpho catenarius Perry, 1811 or as a subspecies of M. epistrophus
Morpho epistrophus (Fabricius, 1796) – Epistrophus white morpho
Morpho laertes (Drury, 1782) may be a synonym of M. epistrophus

Subgenus Crasseia
Species group menelaus
Morpho amathonte (Deyrolle, 1860) or as a subspecies of M. menelaus
Morpho didius Hopffer, 1874 – giant blue morpho – or as a subspecies of M. menelaus
Morpho godarti (Guérin-Méneville, 1844) – Godart's morpho – or as a subspecies of M. menelaus
Morpho menelaus (Linnaeus, 1758) – Menelaus blue morpho

Subgenus Morpho
Species group deidamia
Morpho deidamia (Hübner, [1819]) – Deidamia morpho
Morpho granadensis Felder and Felder, 1867 – Granada morpho – or as a subspecies of M. deidamia
Species group helenor
Morpho helenor (Cramer, 1776) – Helenor blue morpho or common blue morpho
Morpho peleides Kollar, 1850 – Peleides blue morpho, common morpho, or the emperor
Species group achilles
Morpho achilles (Linnaeus, 1758) – Achilles morpho

Ungrouped:
Morpho absoloni May, 1924
Morpho athena Otero, 1966
Morpho niepelti Röber, 1927

Coloration 

Many morpho butterflies are colored in metallic, shimmering shades of blues and greens. These colors are not a result of pigmentation, but are an example of iridescence through structural coloration. Specifically, the microscopic scales covering the morpho's wings reflect incident light repeatedly at successive layers, leading to interference effects that depend on both wavelength and angle of incidence/observance. Thus, the colors appear to vary with viewing angle, but they are surprisingly uniform, perhaps due to the tetrahedral (diamond-like) structural arrangement of the scales or diffraction from overlying cell layers. The wide-angle blue reflection property can be explained by exploring the nanostructures in the scales of the morpho butterfly wings. These optically active structures integrate three design principles leading to the wide-angle reflection: Christmas tree-like shaped ridges, alternating lamellae layers (or "branches"), and a small height offset between neighboring ridges. The reflection spectrum is found to be broad (about 90 nm) for alternating layers and can be controlled by varying the design pattern. The Christmas tree-like pattern helps to reduce the directionality of the reflectance by creating an impedance matching for blue wavelengths. In addition, the height offset between neighboring ridges increases the intensity of reflection for a wide range of angles. This structure may be likened to a photonic crystal. The lamellate structure of their wing scales has been studied as a model in the development of biomimetic fabrics, dye-free paints, and anticounterfeit technology used in currency.

The iridescent lamellae are only present on the dorsal sides of their wings, leaving the ventral sides brown.

The ventral side is decorated with ocelli (eyespots). In some species, such as M. godarti, the dorsal lamellae are so thin that ventral ocelli can peek through. While not all morphos have iridescent coloration, they all have ocelli. In most species, only the males are colorful, supporting the theory that the coloration is used for intrasexual communication between males. The lamellae reflect up to 70% of light falling on them, including any ultraviolet. The eyes of morpho butterflies are thought to be highly sensitive to UV light, so the males are able to see each other from great distances. Some South American species are reportedly visible to the human eye up to one kilometer away.

Also, a number of other species exist which are tawny orange or dark brown (for instance M. hecuba and M. telemachus). Some species are white, principal among these being M. catenarius and M. laertes. An unusual species, fundamentally white in coloration, but which exhibits a stunning pearlescent purple and teal iridescence when viewed at certain angles, is the rare M. sulkowskyi. Some Andean species are small and delicate (M. lympharis). Among the metallic blue Morpho species, M. rhetenor stands out as the most iridescent of all, with M. cypris a close second. Indeed, M. cypris is notable in that specimens mounted in entomological collections exhibit color differences across the wings if they are not 'set' perfectly flat. Many species, like M. cypris and M. rhetenor helena have a white stripe pattern on their colored blue wings as well.

Celebrated author and lepidopterist Vladimir Nabokov described their appearance as "shimmering light-blue mirrors".

Sexual dimorphism 
The blue morpho species exhibit sexual dimorphism. In some species (for instance M.adonis, M. eugenia, M. aega, M. cypris, and M. rhetenor), only the males are iridescent blue; the females are disruptively colored brown and yellow. In other species (for instance M. anaxibia, M. godarti, M. didius, M. amathonte, and M. deidamia), the females are partially iridescent, but less blue than the males.

Habitat

Morpho butterflies inhabit the primary forests of the Amazon and Atlantic. They also adapted to breed in a wide variety of other forested habitats – for instance, the dry deciduous woodlands of Nicaragua and secondary forests.

Biology 
Morphos are diurnal, as males spend the mornings patrolling along the courses of forest streams and rivers. They are territorial and chase any rivals. Morphos typically live alone, excluding in the mating season.
The genus Morpho is palatable, but some species (such as M. amathonte) are very strong fliers; birds—even species which are specialized for catching butterflies on the wing—find it very hard to catch them. The conspicuous blue coloration shared by most Morpho species may be a case of Müllerian mimicry, or may be 'pursuit aposematism'.
The eyespots on the undersides of the wings of both males and females may be a form of automimicry in which a spot on the body of an animal resembles an eye of a different animal to deceive potential predator or prey species, to draw a predator's attention away from the most vulnerable body parts, or to appear as an inedible or even dangerous animal.
Predators include royal flycatchers, jacamars and other insectivorous birds, frogs, and lizards.

Behavior 
Morphos have a very distinctive, slow, bouncy flight pattern due to the wing area being enormous relative to the body size.

Life cycle 
The entire life cycle of the morpho butterfly, from egg to death, is about 115 days.

The larvae hatch from pale-green, dewdrop-like eggs. The caterpillars have reddish-brown bodies with bright lime-green or yellow patches on their backs. Its hairs are irritating to human skin, and when disturbed it secretes a fluid that smells like rancid butter from eversible glands on the thorax. The strong odor is a defense against predators. They feed on a variety of plants. The caterpillar molts five times before entering the pupal stage. The bulbous chrysalis is pale green or jade green and emits a repulsive, ultrasonic sound when touched. It is suspended from a stem or leaf of the food plant.

The adults live for about two to three weeks. They feed on the fluids of fermenting fruit, decomposing animals, tree sap, fungi, and nutrient-rich mud. They are poisonous to predators due to toxins they sequestered from plants on which they fed as caterpillars.

The more common blue morphos are reared en masse in commercial breeding programs. The iridescent wings are used in the manufacture of jewelry and as inlay in woodworking. Papered specimens are sold with the abdomen removed to prevent its oily contents from staining the wings. Significant numbers of live specimens are exported as pupae from several Neotropical countries for exhibition in butterfly houses. Unfortunately, due to their irregular flight pattern and size, their wings are frequently damaged when in captivity.

Host plants 
Morpho larvae, variously according to species and region, feed on Leguminosae, Gramineae, Canellaceae, Guttiferae, Erythroxylaceae, Myrtaceae, Moraceae, Lauraceae, Sapindaceae, Rhamnaceae, Euphorbiaceae, Musaceae, Palmae, Menispermaceae, Tiliaceae, Bignoniaceae, and Menispermaceae.

According to Penz and DeVries the ancestral diet of larval Satyrinae is Poaceae or other monocots. Many morphos have switched to dicots on several occasions during their evolutionary history, but basal species have retained the monocot diets.

Collectors 

Morpho butterflies, often very expensive, have always been prized by extremely wealthy collectors. Famous collections include those of the London jeweler Dru Drury and the Dutch merchant Pieter Teyler van der Hulst, the Paris diplomat Georges Rousseau-Decelle, the financier Walter Rothschild, the Romanov Grand Duke Nicholas Mikhailovich of Russia and the, English and German respectively, businessmen James John Joicey and Curt Eisner. In earlier years, Morphos graced cabinets of curiosities "Kunstkamera" and royal cabinets of natural history notably those of Tsar of Russia Peter the Great, the Austrian empress Maria Theresa and Ulrika Eleonora, Queen of Sweden. More famous is Maria Sibylla Merian, who was not wealthy.

The people along the Rio Negro in Brazil once exploited the territorial habits of the blue morpho (M. menelaus) by luring them into clearings with bright blue decoys. The collected butterfly wings were used as embellishment for ceremonial masks. Adult morpho butterflies feed on the juices of fermenting fruit with which they may also be lured. The butterflies wobble in flight and are easy to catch.

Gallery

Illustrations

See also 
List of tropical and subtropical moist broadleaf forests ecoregions (Neotropical)
Tropical Andes
Arhopala

References

Further reading 

Blandin, P. (2007). The Systematics of the Genus Morpho, Lepidoptera Nymphalidae Hillside Books, Canterbury.
Blandin, P. (1988). The genus Morpho, Lepidoptera Nymphalidae. Part 1. The subgenera Iphimedeia and Schwartzia. Sciences Nat, Venette.
Blandin, P. (1993). The genus Morpho, Lepidoptera Nymphalidae. Part 2. The subgenera Iphixibia, Cytheritis, Balachowskyna, and Cypritis. Sciences Nat, Venette.
Blandin, P. (2007). The genus Morpho, Lepidoptera Nymphalidae. Part 3. The Subgenera Pessonia, Grasseia and Morpho and Addenda to Parts 1 & 2. Hillside Books, Canterbury. Blandin The genus Morpho. Pt. 3.
Fruhstorfer, H. (1912–1913). 6. Familie: Morphidae in Seitz, A. Die Gross-Schmetterlinge der Erde (The Macrolepidoptera of the World) Erde 5: 333–344 (31 May 1912),: 345–352 (5 June 1913),: 353–356 (8 July 1913).

Schäffler, Oliver and Frankenbach, Thomas. (2009). Schmetterlinge der Erde Part 30, Nymphalidae XV: Morpho I Keltern: Goecke & Evers  includes Morpho niepelti and M. theseus.
Schäffler, Oliver and Frankenbach,Thomas, (2010). Schmetterlinge der Erde Part 33, Nymphalidae XVIII: Morpho II Keltern: Goecke & Evers   Includes M. hercules, M. richardus, M. telemachus, M. amphitryon, M. hecuba, and M. cisseis.
Takahashi, Mayumi. (1973). Notes on the genus Morpho (Lepidoptera: Morphidae) collected in the Santa Marta mountains, Colombia, South America. Tyô to Ga 24(4): 107–111, 26 figs.[general; ecology; behavior]

External links 

EOL Taxonomy and images
Butterflies of America Superb collection of scientific specimen photographs. Many of types

Morpho
Morphinae
Nymphalidae of South America
Nymphalidae genera
Taxa named by Johan Christian Fabricius